In mathematics, the conformal radius is a way to measure the size of a simply connected planar domain D viewed from a point z in it. As opposed to notions using Euclidean distance (say, the radius of the largest inscribed disk with center z), this notion is well-suited to use in complex analysis, in particular in conformal maps and conformal geometry.

A closely related notion is the transfinite diameter or (logarithmic) capacity of a compact simply connected set D, which can be considered as the inverse of the conformal radius of the complement E = Dc viewed from infinity.

Definition
Given a simply connected domain D ⊂ C, and a point z ∈ D, by the Riemann mapping theorem there exists a unique conformal map f : D → D onto the unit disk (usually referred to as the uniformizing map) with f(z) = 0 ∈ D and f′(z) ∈ R+. The conformal radius of D from z is then defined as

 

The simplest example is that the conformal radius of the disk of radius r viewed from its center is also r, shown by the uniformizing map x ↦ x/r. See below for more examples.

One reason for the usefulness of this notion is that it behaves well under conformal maps: if φ : D → D′ is a conformal bijection and z in D, then .

A special case: the upper-half plane
Let K ⊂ H be a subset of the upper half-plane such that D := H\K is connected and simply connected, and let z ∈ D be a point. (This is a usual scenario, say, in the Schramm-Loewner evolution). By the Riemann mapping theorem, there is a conformal bijection g : D → H. Then, for any such map g, a simple computation gives that

 

For example, when K = ∅ and z = i, then g can be the identity map, and we get rad(i, H) = 2. Checking that this agrees with the original definition: the uniformizing map f : H → D is

and then the derivative can be easily calculated.

Relation to inradius
That it is a good measure of radius is shown by the following immediate consequence of the Schwarz lemma and the Koebe 1/4 theorem: for z ∈ D ⊂ C,

where dist(z, ∂D) denotes the Euclidean distance between z and the boundary of D, or in other words, the radius of the largest inscribed disk with center z.

Both inequalities are best possible:

 The upper bound is clearly attained by taking D = D and z = 0.

 The lower bound is attained by the following “slit domain”: D = C\R+ and z = −r ∈ R−. The above formula for the upper half-plane gives , and then the formula for transformation under conformal maps gives rad(−r, D) = 4r, while, of course, dist(−r, ∂D) = r.

Version from infinity: transfinite diameter and logarithmic capacity
When D ⊂ C is a connected, simply connected compact set, then its complement E = Dc is a connected, simply connected domain in the Riemann sphere that contains ∞, and one can define

 

where f : C\D → E is the unique bijective conformal map with f(∞) = ∞ and that limit being positive real, i.e., the conformal map of the form

See also the article on the capacity of a set.

The coefficient c0 is called the conformal center of D. It can be shown to lie in the convex hull of D; moreover,

where the radius 2c1 is sharp for the straight line segment of length 4c1.

The Fekete, Chebyshev and modified Chebyshev constants
We define three other quantities that are equal to the transfinite diameter even though they are defined from a very different point of view. Let

denote the product of pairwise distances of the points  and let us define the following quantity for a compact set D ⊂ C:

In other words,  is the supremum of the geometric mean of pairwise distances of n points in D. Since D is compact, this supremum is actually attained by a set of points. Any such n-point set is called a Fekete set.

The limit  exists and it is called the Fekete constant.

 and 

Then the limits

 and 

exist and they are called the Chebyshev constant and modified Chebyshev constant, respectively.
Michael Fekete and Gábor Szegő proved that these constants are equal.

Applications
The conformal radius is a very useful tool, e.g., when working with the Schramm-Loewner evolution.

References

Further reading

External links
. From MathWorld — A Wolfram Web Resource, created by Eric W. Weisstein.

Complex analysis